The Tenzing Montes  (formerly Norgay Montes) are icy mountains near the Hillary Montes that reach up to  above the surface of the dwarf planet Pluto, bordering the southwest region of Sputnik Planitia in the south of Tombaugh Regio (or the part of Tombaugh Regio south of the equator). They are the highest mountain range on Pluto, and also the steepest, with a mean slope of 19.2 degrees.

Naming
The mountains, first viewed by the New Horizons spacecraft on 14 July 2015, and announced by NASA on 15 July 2015, are named after the Nepalese mountaineer Tenzing Norgay, who, along with Sir Edmund Hillary, made the first successful ascent of the highest peak on Earth, Mount Everest (29 May 1953). The mountains were informally called Norgay Montes by the New Horizons team, but that name was later changed from Norgay to Tenzing. On 7 September 2017, the name Tenzing Montes was officially approved together with the names of Tombaugh Regio and twelve other nearby surface features.

Highest peaks
Several massifs within Tenzing Montes reach elevations of more than 4 km above the surrounding terrain. The table below is based on Table 3 in.

Gallery

Videos

See also
 Geography of Pluto
 Geology of Pluto
 List of geological features on Pluto
 List of tallest mountains in the Solar System

Notes

References

Extraterrestrial mountains
Surface features of Pluto
Tenzing Norgay
Geography of Pluto
Articles containing video clips